The Pogonip Group is an Ordovician period geologic group located in southern Nevada and in Utah.

Geology
Its subunits in Nevada, from youngest/later to oldest/earlier, are:

It preserves fossils dating back to the Early Ordovician stage of the Ordovician period.

See also 
 List of fossiliferous stratigraphic units in Nevada
 List of fossiliferous stratigraphic units in Utah

References

Geologic groups of Nevada
Geologic groups of Utah
Lower Ordovician Series
Ordovician geology of Nevada
Ordovician geology of Utah
Ordovician System of North America